This list includes properties and districts listed on the National Register of Historic Places in Chowan County, North Carolina. Click the "Map of all coordinates" link to the right to view a Google map of all properties and districts with latitude and longitude coordinates in the table below.

|}

See also

National Register of Historic Places listings in North Carolina
List of National Historic Landmarks in North Carolina

References

Chowan County, North Carolina
Chowan County
Buildings and structures in Chowan County, North Carolina